Stengl is a surname. Notable people with the surname include:

Anne Elisabeth Stengl (born 1950), American children's author
Manfred Stengl (1946–1992), Austrian luger
Vladimir Štengl (born 1942), Croatian politician

See also
Stengel